Juan Carlos Echeverry Garzón (born 12 September 1962) is a Colombian economist and former president of Ecopetrol, an oil and gas company. He served as the 68th Minister of Finance and Public Credit of Colombia from 2010 to 2012. He is the president of Econcept, a financial consulting firm in Bogotá and is an Associate Professor of Economics at University of the Andes. He was also a visiting professor at IE Business School, Madrid in 2013.

He served as Colombia's Minister of Economic Planning from 2000 to 2002 and held the position of Dean of Economics at the University of the Andes from 2002-2006. He was appointed finance minister by Colombia's President-elect Juan Manuel Santos on June 22, 2010.

Echeverry has a Ph.D. in Economics from New York University and a B.A. in Economics from the University of the Andes. Echeverry writes a weekly editorial for CNN en Español.

References

1962 births
Living people
Politicians from Bogotá
University of Los Andes (Colombia) alumni
Academic staff of the University of Los Andes (Colombia)
New York University alumni
Colombian economists
Directors of the National Planning Department of Colombia
Ministers of Finance and Public Credit of Colombia